, was a lawyer, politician and cabinet minister in the Empire of Japan, serving as a member of both the Lower House and Upper House of the Diet of Japan.

Biography 
Fujisawa was a native of Sendai in Mutsu Province (present-day Miyagi Prefecture. Following the Meiji restoration he studied the English language and passed his bar examinations in 1879. He distinguished himself with his role in the Fukushima incident of 1882. He began his political career in 1889 as an assemblyman in the Sendai City Assembly. He subsequently rose to the position of Chairman of the Sendai City Assembly, member of the Miyagi Prefectural Assembly and Chairman of the Miyagi Prefectural Assembly.

Fujisawa entered national politics as a member of the Lower House of the Diet of Japan in the 1892 General Election, and was subsequently re-elected thirteen times. In his early career, he was a member of the Rikken Kaishintō, but later served as an officer in the Rikken Dōshikai, Kenseikai and Rikken Minseitō.
Fujisawa joined the cabinet under the brief 1st Wakatsuki Reijirō administration in 1927 as Minister of Commerce and Industry.  In 1930, he became Speaker of the House of the Lower House of the Diet of Japan. In 1931, Fujisawa was awarded a seat in the House of Peers. In 1934, Fujisawa was appointed to the Privy Council.

He died on April 3, 1940 of pneumonia in Tokyo.

References

1859 births
1940 deaths
People from Sendai
Members of the House of Peers (Japan)
Government ministers of Japan
Members of the House of Representatives (Empire of Japan)
Rikken Dōshikai politicians
Kenseikai politicians
Rikken Minseitō politicians
Rikken Kaishintō politicians
19th-century Japanese politicians